St James is a suburb shared between the Town of Victoria Park and the City of Canning in the Perth metropolitan area.

It was gazetted in 1957 by the Canning Road Board (now City of Canning) and is named after St James's Park in London. A number of streets in the suburb are named after notable UK Prime Ministers and Members of Parliament (including Palmerston, Walpole and Pitt Streets). Boundary Road defines the boundary between the City of Canning and Town of Victoria Park and is the main east-west thoroughfare in the suburb. The main north-south counterparts are Albany Highway in the east and Berwick Street-Chapman Road in the west.

References

Suburbs of Perth, Western Australia